Scenopinus niger , a 'window fly', is a member of the Scenopinidae family of flies. It is found in the Palearctic.
 
Scenopinus niger  is  "a rather small, very black oblong fly. Legs blackish except on the tarsi. Frons rather shining. Eyes of the male widely separated. Hind tibite of the male very much dilated.". It is a minor pest

References

External links 
Biolib

Insects described in 1776
Scenopinidae
Taxa named by Charles De Geer